John Beresford MBE (born 4 September 1966) is an English former professional footballer and sports television pundit.

As a player, he was a left back who notably played in the Premier League with Newcastle United and Southampton. His time at St James' Park saw him win the Football League First Division title in 1992, as well as finishing runners-up in two Premier League seasons, as well as appearing in the 1998 FA Cup final. Initially coming through the Manchester City academy. he also spent time in the Football League with Barnsley, Portsmouth and Birmingham City, in Donegal, Republic of Ireland with Finn Harps, and with non-league sides Ossett Town, Alfreton Town and Halifax Town. He was capped twice at England B team level.

Since retiring, he has largely worked as a pundit for ESPN. In 2017 he was awarded an MBE for his support for the "Show Racism the Red Card" campaign.

Playing career
Beresford was born in Sheffield, West Riding of Yorkshire. In his footballing career he played for clubs Manchester City, Finn Harps F.C. Barnsley, Portsmouth, Newcastle United,  Southampton and Birmingham City.

He is best known for his Newcastle United spell between 1992 and 1998, with his attacking tendencies being crucial to "the Entertainers". During this time Beresford formed a formidable partnership with the other full back, his doppelgänger Warren Barton. One of the highlights of his time at Newcastle was scoring twice in the first leg of their Champions League qualifier against Croatia Zagreb in 1997.

In a Premier League match against Aston Villa on 14 April 1996, Beresford was substituted after 25 minutes by manager Kevin Keegan after an argument between them that took place during play. The player later apologized for his behavior, but did not play another game that season. By the following campaign, he had won his place back in the team.

Beresford is also known for missing his spot kick in the 1992 FA Cup semi-final penalty shootout against Liverpool while playing for Portsmouth. Liverpool agreed to sign him after the end of that season, but he failed a medical evaluation and Kevin Keegan signed him for Newcastle instead. Beresford won two England 'B' caps in 1994, against Northern Ireland 'B' and the Republic of Ireland 'B'. He was also called up as cover for the senior England squad in March 1993.

Personal life
In 2017 he was awarded an MBE for his educational work and supporting the "Show Racism the Red Card" campaign.

Honours
Newcastle United
Football League First Division: 1992–93
FA Cup runner-up: 1997–98

Individual 
PFA Team of the Year: 1991–92 Second Division, 1992–93 First Division
MBE: 2017, for 20 years service to Show Racism the Red Card, the Anti-Racism Education Charity.

References

External links
The official website of John Beresford
True greats profile

1966 births
Living people
Footballers from Sheffield
English footballers
England youth international footballers
England B international footballers
Association football fullbacks
Manchester City F.C. players
Finn Harps F.C. players
Barnsley F.C. players
Portsmouth F.C. players
Newcastle United F.C. players
Southampton F.C. players
Birmingham City F.C. players
Ossett Town F.C. players
Alfreton Town F.C. players
Halifax Town A.F.C. players
English Football League players
Premier League players